Petr Kostka (born 11 June 1938) is a Czech actor.

Kostka was born in Říčany near Prague, Czechoslovakia. In 2003, he received Thalia Award for performing Herman in Smíšené pocity Mixed Emotions.

Selected filmography
 Fetters (1961)
 A Jester's Tale (1964)
 Zítra vstanu a opařím se čajem (1977)
 Což takhle dát si špenát (1977)
 Jára Cimrman Lying, Sleeping (1983)
 Fešák Hubert (1984)
 Inženýrská odysea

References

External links 
1938: Petr Kostka slaví narozeniny (Czech Television)
 

1938 births
Living people
People from Říčany
Czech male film actors
20th-century Czech male actors
21st-century Czech male actors
Recipients of the Thalia Award